Mozenavir (DMP-450) is an antiviral drug which was developed as a treatment for HIV/AIDS. It acts as an HIV protease inhibitor and binds to this target with high affinity, however despite promising results in early testing, mozenavir was unsuccessful in human clinical trials. Studies continue into related derivatives.

References 

Anti–RNA virus drugs
Antiviral drugs